Pat Thornton (born September 5, 1976) is a Canadian television actor, comedian, and writer.

Early life
Thornton was born in Kingston and raised in Mississauga, Ontario.

Career 
Thornton was a founding member of the sketch comedy troupe The Sketchersons, he also later appeared in the sketch comedy series Hotbox and Sunnyside.

His acting roles have included a recurring role in the sitcom Satisfaction, the web series Space Janitors and Everyone's Famous, and guest appearances in Warehouse 13, Working the Engels, Spun Out and Royal Canadian Air Farce. He garnered two Canadian Screen Award nominations at the 2nd Canadian Screen Awards in 2014, in the categories of Supporting Actor in a Comedy Series for Satisfaction, and Performance in a Program or Series Produced for Digital Media for Everyone's Famous. At the 4th Canadian Screen Awards in 2016, Thornton and the other core cast of Sunnyside collectively won the award for Best Performance in a Variety or Sketch Comedy Program or Series.

In 2017, he starred in the comedy film Filth City, loosely based on the drug scandal surrounding former Toronto mayor Rob Ford. On January 29, 2019, Thornton was nominated for a Juno Award in the Comedy Album of the Year category for his stand-up comedy album Chicken!

Filmography

Film

Television

References

External links

Living people
1976 births
Canadian male film actors
Canadian male television actors
Canadian male web series actors
21st-century Canadian male actors
Canadian sketch comedians
Male actors from Kingston, Ontario
Canadian male comedians
21st-century Canadian comedians
Comedians from Ontario
Canadian Comedy Award winners
Canadian Screen Award winners